Follebu is a village in Gausdal Municipality in Innlandet county, Norway.

Follebu Church (Follebu kirke) is located just to the northwest of the village. It was built in a Gothic style of stone and brick between the years 1260 and 1300.

Name
The Old Norse form of the name was Foldabu. The first element is probably the genitive pluralis of fold which means "meadow", "plain", or "open and flat land". The last element of the name is bú which means "rural district". The area is quite flat and open, especially when it is compared to the surrounding areas.

References

Gausdal
Villages in Innlandet